The 2005–06 St. John's Red Storm men's basketball team represented St. John's University during the 2005–06 NCAA Division I men's basketball season. The Red Storm, led by head coach Norm Roberts in his second year at the school, played their home games at Carnesecca Arena and Madison Square Garden as members of the Big East Conference.

Off season

Departures

Class of 2005 signees

Transfer additions

Roster

Schedule and results

|-
!colspan=9 style="background:#FF0000; color:#FFFFFF;"| Exhibition

|-
!colspan=9 style="background:#FF0000; color:#FFFFFF;"| Non-Conference Regular Season

|-
!colspan=9 style="background:#FF0000; color:#FFFFFF;"| Big East Conference Regular Season

References

St. John's Red Storm men's basketball seasons
St. John's
St. John's Red Storm men's bask
St. John's Red Storm men's bask